Vladimir Gerasimov may refer to:

 Vladimir Gerasimov (footballer, born 1975), Russian football coach and former player
 Vladimir Gerasimov (footballer, born 1989) (1989–2018), Russian footballer
 Vladimir Ivanovich Gerasimov, Hero of the Soviet Union
 Vladimir Gerasimov (general) (1931–2021), Russian army officer